Burnt Chimney is an unincorporated community in Franklin County, Virginia, United States. It was also known as Reverie.

Waverly was listed on the National Register of Historic Places in 1996.

References

Unincorporated communities in Franklin County, Virginia
Unincorporated communities in Virginia